A building superintendent or building supervisor (often shortened to super) is a term used in the United States and Canada to refer to a manager responsible for repair and maintenance in a residential building. They are the first point of contact for residents of the building.

Although very common in large cities in the United States and Canada, the job title is not often used in the rest of the world. Other common titles for this job include simply "super", "resident manager", "apartment manager", and "caretaker".

Duties and functions
Building superintendents are expected to take care of minor issues and repairs, such as patch drywall and do painting, repair/replace flooring, doors, windows, etc., fix simple electrical, plumbing and heating, ventilation, and air conditioning (HVAC) issues, do appliance repairs, perform regular preventive maintenance and manage regular inspections and security. For larger jobs and major repairs, they will organize, call, and supervise the work of outside contractors. Building superintendents often get discounts in their rent or free rent plus a salary in exchange for their services. The amount of compensation they receive is usually proportional to the size of the building.

The superintendent or resident manager may report to the landlord or a property manager for any problem outside his or her control.

See also
Certified resident manager
Property management
Property manager

References

External links



Cleaning and maintenance occupations
Property management